Grace E Parsons (born 18 August 2003) is an Australian cricketer who plays as a right-arm leg break bowler for Queensland in the Women's National Cricket League (WNCL) and Brisbane Heat in the Women's Big Bash League (WBBL).

Domestic career
Parsons plays grade cricket for Gold Coast District Cricket Club. She made her debut for Queensland on 6 March 2022, against South Australia in the WNCL, taking 4/33 from her 7 overs. She went on to play six matches overall for the side that season, taking 6 wickets at an average of 31.33. She played 10 matches for the side in the 2022–23 Women's National Cricket League season, and was the side's second-leading wicket-taker, with 15 wickets at an average of 20.66. Against South Australia on 17 February 2023, she took 4/40 from her ten overs. She was also included in the Brisbane Heat squad in the Women's Big Bash League, but did not play a match.

References

External links

Grace Parsons at Cricket Australia

Living people
2003 births
Place of birth missing (living people)
Australian women cricketers
Queensland Fire cricketers
Brisbane Heat (WBBL) cricketers